James William Chappell (3 March 1915 – 3 April 1973) was an ice hockey player who played in the English National League (ENL). He is known for playing for the Great Britain national ice hockey team which won the gold medal at the 1936 Winter Olympics. He is a member of the British Ice Hockey Hall of Fame.

Career
Although born in Huddersfield in England, Chappell's family emigrated to Canada when he was 10 years old. He learned to play ice hockey while living in Ontario where he progressed through the junior ranks to play with the Oshawa Collegiates and the Whitby Intermediates between 1931 and 1934.

Club
Chappell returned to England in 1935, when he joined the Earls Court Rangers for their inaugural season in the ENL. He stayed with Earls Court for three seasons before joining the Fife Flyers in Scotland for their inaugural season in 1938–39. He again joined a club for their inaugural season when he joined the Dunfermline Vikings for the 1939–40 season. After World War II – in which he took part in the D-Day landings at Normandy – Chappell joined the Brighton Tigers for the 1946–47 season staying with them until he retired following the 1948–49 season.

International

Chappell played for the GB national team at the 1936 Winter Olympics, where he scored two goals in the six games he played and helped the team to win the gold medal.

Chappell also played for the GB national team in the 1937 and 1938 World Championships. In the 1937 championships he helped the team to silver medal and, as the highest placed European team, the gold medal in the European Championships at the tournament. In the 1938 championships he again helped the team to silver medal.

In 1948, Chappell again appeared for the GB national team at the Olympics held in Switzerland when the team finished in sixth place.

Retirement
After retiring from ice hockey, Chappell continued to contribute to the game for a while as a referee. He then returned with his family to Canada where he was successful in business before he died suddenly while on holiday in Pinellas County, Florida in 1976.

Awards and honours
Olympic gold medalist in 1936.
World Championship silver medalist in 1937 and 1938.
European Championship gold medalist in 1937.
Inducted to the British Ice Hockey Hall of Fame in 1993.

External links

British Ice Hockey Hall of Fame entry

1915 births
1973 deaths
Brighton Tigers players
British Ice Hockey Hall of Fame inductees
English ice hockey centres
English Olympic medallists
Ice hockey players at the 1936 Winter Olympics
Ice hockey players at the 1948 Winter Olympics
Medalists at the 1936 Winter Olympics
Olympic gold medallists for Great Britain
Olympic ice hockey players of Great Britain
Olympic medalists in ice hockey
British Army personnel of World War II